Wayne Proctor is a former professional rugby league footballer who played in the 1980s.

Playing career

International honours
Wayne Proctor won a cap for Great Britain while at Hull in 1984 against Papua New Guinea.

County Cup Final appearances
Wayne Proctor played left-, i.e. number 11, and scored a try in Hull FC's 13-2 victory over Castleford in the 1983 Yorkshire County Cup Final during the 1983–84 season at Elland Road, Leeds on Saturday 15 October 1983, and played right-, i.e. number 12, in the 29-12 victory over Hull Kingston Rovers in the 1984 Yorkshire County Cup Final during the 1984–85 season at Boothferry Park, Kingston upon Hull on Saturday 27 October 1984.

John Player Special Trophy Final appearances
Wayne Proctor played right-, i.e. number 12, in Hull FC's 0-12 defeat by Hull Kingston Rovers in the 1984–85 John Player Special Trophy Final during the 1984–85 season at Boothferry Park, Kingston upon Hull on Saturday 26 January 1985.

References

External links
!Great Britain Statistics at englandrl.co.uk (statistics currently missing due to not having appeared for both Great Britain, and England)
 (archived by web.archive.org) Stats → Past Players → P at hullfc.com
 (archived by web.archive.org) Statistics at hullfc.com

Great Britain national rugby league team players
Hull F.C. players
Living people
English rugby league players
Place of birth missing (living people)
Rugby league centres
Rugby league second-rows
Year of birth missing (living people)